Duma Key is a novel by American writer Stephen King published on January 22, 2008, by Scribner. The book reached No. 1 on the New York Times Best Seller List. It is King's first novel to be set in Florida, as well as the first to be set in Minnesota. The dust jacket features holographic lettering.

Plot
Wealthy Minnesotan building-contractor Edgar Freemantle barely survives a severe work-site accident wherein his truck is crushed by a crane. Freemantle loses his right arm, while suffering severe head injuries impairing his speech, vision, and memory. During his long recovery, Edgar experiences suicidal thoughts and violent abusive mood swings, spurring his wife to file for divorce.

On the advice of his psychologist, Dr. Kamen, Edgar relocates southward, renting a beach house on the island of Duma Key, off Florida's coast. Kamen further advises Freemantle to rekindle his onetime sketching hobby as a restorative. Edgar retains local college student Jack Cantori as part-time shopper and personal assistant. Soon after, Freemantle meets and befriends the island's other full-time residents, octogenarian heiress Elizabeth Eastlake (sufferer of final-stage dementia, whose family trust owns most of the island), and her live-in attendant, Jerome Wireman, himself a once-gifted attorney whose wife and daughter's tragic deaths led him to (unsuccessfully) attempt suicide via gunshot wound.

Decades-old paranormal phenomena revisit the island as Freemantle delves obsessively into his art.  Edgar creates with furious energy, lapsing into a semi-conscious haze; his paintings and sketches capture psychic visions, revealing his ex-wife's romantic affair, his friend's suicidal depression, and his younger daughter Ilse's fleeting marital engagement.  Later, Freemantle uses his newfound artistic powers to manipulate the outside world, healing Wireman's degenerating neurological condition, and suffocating a child murderer in his jail cell. During Ilse's visit to Duma Key, the father-daughter duo drive to a disused, overgrown section of the island, where colors seem unnaturally vivid, and Ilse becomes violently ill.  Elizabeth Eastlake warns Edgar via telephone conversations that Duma "has never been a lucky place for daughters", and that his paintings should be sold to multiple geographically-distant buyers, lest their otherworldly power grow too concentrated or dangerous.

Freemantle comes to learn that Duma Key's beach house has hosted many successful artists (including Salvador Dalí) during its eighty-year tenure, Elizabeth Eastlake was, herself, a prodigious artist in her childhood, and how both Edgar and Wireman manifest pronounced psychic talents while on or near the island, seemingly stemming from their debilitating brain injuries. Freemantle's artworks become more vivid and distressing, featuring ship-and-seaside compositions, whose vessel and mysterious red-cloaked passenger draw nearer to shore in each successive painting. Elizabeth grows alternately lucid then incoherent as her dementia worsens, scattering her beloved china figurines, murmuring that "The table is leaking", and repeatedly urging Wireman to throw one faceless figurine into her koi pond. In a moment of chilling clarity, Eastlake asks Edgar if he has begun painting the ship yet.

Freemantle's paintings attract statewide acclaim. He hosts an art exhibition and accompanying lecture at an upscale Sarasota gallery, gaining a devoted audience (including Edgar's visiting loved ones) and yielding half a million in sales.  Elizabeth Eastlake makes a rare appearance at said exhibition;  upon seeing Edgar's ship-and-seaside paintings, she reacts violently, making cryptic references to her childhood playthings and long-drowned sisters, warning that "She has grown so strong", "The table is leaking", and "Drown her back to sleep", before suffering an incapacitating (and ultimately fatal) stroke. Freemantle notices previously-unseen details in his work: the ship's rotting sails, children toys littering its decks, screaming faces hiding in its foamy wake.

Narrative timelines interweave as Edgar Freemantle's present-day nightmare parallels the 1927 Eastlake familial tragedy. Young Elizabeth, suffering a head-wound in a childhood horse-carriage accident, turns to sketching and scribbling as a means of recuperation. An outside presence—"Perse"—speaks to Elizabeth, sometimes in her mind, or sometimes through her rag-doll, filling her with knowledge, reality-altering powers, and a gradual infiltration of sinister urges. Elizabeth directs her bootlegger father to a pile of ship debris in the shallows, unearthing a red-cloaked porcelain figurine. The girl's sketches grow progressively more alien and malevolent, until, driven by fear, she rebels against Perse, provoking the entity's wrath. As an act of retaliation, Elizabeth's twin sisters are lured into the ocean to drown. Only Elizabeth's nursemaid, Melda, takes direct action; as Perse's drowned-sister things move beachward, the governess holds them off by means of silver jewelry, buying precious moments with her life while Elizabeth neutralizes the Perse statuette.

Freemantle faces similar otherworldly dangers while unraveling the Eastlake mystery.  He returns home to find "Where our sister?" childishly scrawled on an unused canvas. Edgar then discovers that those in possession of his artworks either die, or are possessed and driven into murderous deeds by "Perse." He persuades his loved ones to discard their paintings, but not before a co-opted art critic drowns his daughter, Ilse. As Edgar, Jack, and Wireman race to discover the secret of mad Persephone's rise and subsequent banishment, the ghost ship's undead passengers return for them. Fighting their way to the island's overgrown region—Heron's Roost, the original Eastlake manor—the trio locate the Perse-carving, trapped in fresh (as opposed to her native salt) water, and sealed in a (water-filled) ceramic keg of table whiskey, in which a crack has formed during the passage of years ("the table is leaking"). Edgar returns the figurine to its fresh-water slumber, and faces down one final Perse-temptation, wearing the face of his drowned daughter Ilse. Freemantle and Wireman then fly north, to Minnesota, where they drop the statuette into Lake Phalen's freshwater depths, so it can forever sleep undisturbed.

Wireman makes plans to move to Tamazunchale in Mexico and start up a hotel business. He asks Freemantle to join him when he is ready and if he wants to. However, Wireman dies of a heart attack only two months later at Tamazunchale's open-air markets before Freemantle has a chance to see him again.

Edgar Freemantle then commences his final painting: a massive tropical storm, destroying Duma Key.

Characters

Edgar Freemantle
The central character in the book, which focuses on his struggles. He eventually takes the lead in the climactic fight against Perse.
Jerome Wireman
A former lawyer from Omaha who moved down to Florida after losing his wife and daughter, surviving a suicide attempt, and being fired from his law firm.
Elizabeth Eastlake
A wealthy heiress and former art patron suffering from Alzheimer's disease, she plays a major role in the story's background and urges the protagonists to fight the evil force present on the island.
Pam Freemantle
 Edgar's wife who divorces him at the beginning of the novel. The mother of Melinda and Ilse Freemantle. During the novel she has several affairs, but gradually reconciles with him until the events of the climax begin.
Ilse Freemantle
 Edgar's younger daughter who remains the only person from his "other life" to stay close to him and who is the person he loves most in the world.
Jack Cantori
 A local college student who serves as Edgar's chauffeur and handyman, keeping the house stocked with groceries and picking up whatever odds and ends he needs. It is his quick thinking that allows them to trap Perse at the end of the novel.
Nan Melda
 Elizabeth Eastlake’s nanny and housekeeper for the Eastlake family in the 1920s who discovered Elizabeth’s powers with drawing and found out about Perse. Elizabeth confided in Nan Melda and they worked together to defeat Perse by Melda creating a distraction while Elizabeth submerged the Perse-statuette into a freshwater tank. Nan Melda was killed by Elizabeth’s father after Perse tricked him into believing she was harming his children. Nan Melda’s legacy helped Edgar and the others to discover Perse’s weakness to silver and fresh water.
Perse
The evil force manifested on Duma Key, she first reached out through young Elizabeth Eastlake to get back to the surface from the ocean before being trapped in freshwater (she is left powerless by it), until the present day. She commands a ship of damned souls, and while not human is said to have something distinctly feminine about her, and she is manifest in an old china doll with a red cloak. She is again put back to sleep at the end of the novel though the characters fear she will eventually escape again. Her full name (Persephone), description and role in the book are all generally influenced by and taken from the Greek Goddess Persephone, the Queen of the Underworld.

Minor characters
There are a large number of minor characters in the book who have only passing significance to the main characters or to the plot of the book, including large numbers of friends and family from Edgar's "other life" as well as Wireman's family and boss, a number of characters with loose association to the two, and the various people who rent houses on Duma Key during the tourism season.

Critical and popular reception
Critics mainly liked the book. King told USA Today that "a lot of today's reviewers grew up reading my fiction. Most of the old critics who panned anything I wrote are either dead or retired".

The New York Times critic Janet Maslin called the novel "frank and well grounded" and lauded the brevity and imagery of the novel, as well as the furious pace of the last third. Mark Rahner of the Seattle Times criticized King as a little unoriginal and longwinded, but praised the characters and the terror of the novel.

Richard Rayner in the Los Angeles Times called the novel a "beautiful, scary idea" with gritty down-to-earth characters. "[King] writes as always with energy and drive and a wit and grace for which critics often fail to give him credit [but] the creepy and largely interior terror of the first two-thirds of the story dissipates somewhat when demon sailors come clanking out of the ocean." The Boston Globe's Erica Noonan called the novel a "welcome return" to a similar style of some of King's better novels.

Film
A film adaptation was in development but the project has stalled.

See also

 Memory, a related short story by King.  King describes it as "the first chapter of Duma Key all kind of dressed up" in the Lilja's Library interview.
Alan Wake, a 2010 video game with a similar premise to Duma Key. King's work is repeatedly referenced during the game.

References

External links
Interview with King in which he discusses Duma Key
King's official site

Novels by Stephen King
2008 American novels
Novels set in Florida
American horror novels
Novels set in Minnesota
Bram Stoker Award for Novel winners